Verla is a village in the Bardez sub-district of Goa. It is located on the outskirts of Mapusa town.

At the 2011 official census of Goa, there were 858 households with a population of 3,685 (1,890 are males and 1,795 females). Its under-six population was 403 (206 boys and 197 girl)s.

References

Villages in North Goa district